Andreas "Andy" Papoulias is an American former soccer player who played as a midfielder. He earned three caps with the U.S. national team in 1984 and 1985.

Club career
In 1979, Papoulias played for the New York Apollo of the American Soccer League.  He then moved to the Carolina Lightnin' for the 1981 season.  In 1984, Papoulias played for the New York Nationals in the United Soccer League.  In 1984, he began the season with the Las Vegas Americans of the Major Indoor Soccer League season.  He then moved to the New York Cosmos for two games.  In 1985, he moved to the Greek American AA of the Cosmopolitan Soccer League.  He then spent several years playing in Greece before returning to the United States in 1989 to play for the Tampa Bay Rowdies of the American Soccer League.  However, the team was unable to sign him before the transfer dead line.  He returned to Europe where he continued to play in Greece and Cyprus until signing with the Rowdies for the 1992 season.  He played only one game with Tampa Bay before being waived on May 27, 1992.

National team
Papoulias' first game with the national team came when he came on for Chico Borja in a November 30, 1984 tie with Ecuador.  On December 2, 1984, he came on for Sonny Askew in another tie with Ecuador.  His last national team game came on February 8, 1985, when he replaced Jeff Hooker in the 74th minute of a 1–1 tie with Switzerland.

References

External links

 MISL stats

1962 births
American expatriate soccer players
American Professional Soccer League players
American Soccer League (1933–1983) players
American soccer players
Carolina Lightnin' players
Greek American AA players
Las Vegas Americans players
Major Indoor Soccer League (1978–1992) players
New York Apollo players
New York Cosmos (MISL) players
New York Nationals (USL) players
Tampa Bay Rowdies (1975–1993) players
United States men's international soccer players
United Soccer League (1984–85) players
Living people
Association football midfielders